Kim Tae-hoon may refer to:

 Kim Tae-hoon (actor) (born 1975), South Korean actor
 Kim Tae-hoon (golfer) (born 1985), South Korean golfer
 Kim Tae-hoon (speed skater) (born 1988), South Korean speed skater
 Kim Tae-hun (born 1994), South Korean taekwondo practitioner